Synthesizer is an album by the synthpop band Information Society. It was released on September 1, 2007, from the band's official website, and on October 9, 2007, in record stores.

Track listing
 Baby Just Wants - 5:16
 Back In The Day - 4:49
 I Like The Way You Werk It - 4:41
 Run Away - 3:46
 Free - 4:12
 I Love It When... - 4:47
 More To This - 3:53
 Somnambulistic - 4:53
 Burning Bridges - 5:56
 Can't Get Enough - 3:37
 This Way Tonight - 4:15
 Synthesizer - 4:41
 The Seeds Of Pain - 5:27

Track listing for The Brazilian pressing on Maxpop/Universal
 Baby Just Wants - 5:16
 Back In The Day - 4:49
 I Like The Way You Werk It - 4:41
 Run Away - 3:46
 Free - 4:12
 I Love It When... - 4:47
 More To This - 3:53
 Somnambulistic - 4:53
 Burning Bridges - 5:56
 Can't Get Enough - 3:37
 This Way Tonight - 4:15
 The Seeds Of Pain - 5:27
 Synthesizer - 4:41
 Back In The Day (Maxpop Remix)
 Runaway 2008 (Maxpop Remix)

Liner notes

Production credits
Produced by: Information Society
Music director: Paul Robb
Recorded at Paul's house

Musical credits
 Paul Robb
 James Cassidy
 Christopher Anton
 Leila Mack
 Colleen Fitzpatrick
 Kurt Harland Larson Vocals on "The Seeds of Pain"
 Angela Michael
 Dave Derby

Additional credits
Art direction: Adam King / King Design Office
Photography: Tyler Shields, Brandon Showers

References

External links
 Information Society official site
 Dave Derby
 Angela Michael
 King Design Office
 Brandon Showers Photography

2007 albums
Information Society (band) albums